The 2010–11 Arkansas Razorbacks men's basketball team represented the University of Arkansas during the college basketball season of 2010–2011. The team's head coach was John Pelphrey, who entered his fourth and final season.

Roster

Schedule

|-
!colspan=12 style=|Exhibition

|-
!colspan=12 style=|Regular Season

|-
!colspan=12 style=| SEC Tournament

Arkansas
Arkansas Razorbacks men's basketball seasons
Razor
Razor